Only the Animals may refer to:

Only the Animals (film), 2019 French film
Only the Animals (short story collection), 2014 book by Ceridwen Dovey